Paraćin is a town and municipality located in the Pomoravlje District of central Serbia. Located in the Velika Morava river valley, north of Kruševac and southeast of Kragujevac, the town had a population of 25,104 in 2011. It also has a civilian airport.

History
There is a Neolithic archaeological site in the village of Drenovac. Basarabi pottery from the 8th Century BC depicting a domestic rooster was discovered near the town. The Roman fort at Momčilov Grad produced a great number of coins of Byzantine Emperor Justinian (525–565).

The medieval town of Petrus was granted by Emperor Dušan to the local župan Vukoslav. It comprised 14 monasteries and churches, all from the 14th century, along the rivers Crnica and Grza. As of 2017, several of the monasteries are being restored while there are plans to restore the town of Petrus, too, and to establish a touristic complex which would encompass both the town and the monasteries.

Paraćin was mentioned for the first time in 1375. That year, Prince Lazar of Serbia issued a charter to the Monastery of Great Lavra by which he granted to the monastery villages in the Petruš region, and Trg Parakinov brod ("Town of Parakin's river crossing"). It is believed that the name of the town originated from Parakin, name of a ferryman who ferried the people across the Crnica river, on which the town is located. In time, the name evolved into Paraćin.

In the 19th century, with the construction of the railway and its further branching, and already being located on the most important road route, Tsarigrad Road, Paraćin became a major traffic hub. The industry followed the traffic, so Paraćin was one of the largest industrial centers of Serbia in the 19th and 20th century, and the most densely populated town in country in the late 19th century.

From 1929 to 1941, Paraćin was part of the Morava Banovina of the Kingdom of Yugoslavia.

Folklore
Nickname for an inhabitant of Paraćin is Džigeran, derived from the colloquial Serbian word for liver, džigerica, and originating from the 19th century. There are couple of jovial stories how it came about and both stem from the popular local rivalry between the towns of Paraćin and Jagodina. According to one story, Serbian ruler Prince Miloš Obrenović, visited Paraćin. The hosts didn't know what to prepare for the prince, so the townsfolk from the neighboring Jagodina told them to prepare liver, as the prince adores it. Actually, it was quite the opposite, so when prince tasted the liver, which he couldn't stand, he said: Oh liver, are you meat? Oh, people of Paraćin, are you humans? Another story goes that a train hit a turkey in Jagodina (turkey is town's symbol) and dragged it all the way to Paraćin, with only liver remaining on the locomotive.

Settlements
Apart from the town of Paraćin, the municipality includes the following settlements, along with number of residents (2002 census):

Demographics

Economy
The following table gives a preview of total number of registered people employed in legal entities per their core activity (as of 2018):

Culture
The town has a Home Museum, a library and a "Pitagora" gallery.

Tourism
The Sisevac excursion place is the most popular excursion sites in the municipality. Sisevac is surrounded by forests and is the location of the Crnica river spring. Due to the favorable microclimate and the natural springs of the mineral water, it was known as the weather spa already in the 14th century.

Another excursion site is Grza, through which the river of the same name runs through. Popular attraction is the village of Gornja Mutnica and the river Suvara.

Notable citizens
 Svetolik Dragačevac, retired police chief who sent a threatening letter to Adolf Hitler in March 1941
 Ana Nikolić, Serbian pop singer
 Bojan Krkić Sr., former Yugoslav and Serbian professional footballer
 Ivana Sert, Serbian-Turkish TV personality, model, and fashion designer.
 Marčelo, Serbian hip hop musician
 Nenad Đorđević, Serbian footballer
 Ivica Radosavljević, Serbian / Swiss basketball player
 Andrija Radovanović, Serbian footballer

International relations

Twin towns — Sister cities
Paraćin is twinned with:
 Eleftherio-Kordelio, Greece
 Perdika, Greece
 Murska Sobota, Slovenia
 Jablanica, Bosnia and Herzegovina

References

External links

 

Populated places in Pomoravlje District
Municipalities and cities of Šumadija and Western Serbia